Mark Tunde O. Odejobi (born 18 January 1988, in London, England) was a rugby union player for Esher in the Aviva Championship. He previously played for London Wasps in the Premiership. He also had a loan spell at London Welsh. Up until 2009 he played at winger. At the start of 2010 he started playing in his new position at flanker. His nickname is Oddjob.

Educated at Dulwich College & Millfield School.

In November 2011, Mark joined National Division 3 South West side Redingensians, for whom he plays on the wing.

References

External links

1988 births
Living people
Alumni of Birkbeck, University of London
Black British sportsmen
English rugby union players
Medalists at the 2013 Summer Universiade
Rosslyn Park F.C. players
Rugby union players from Southwark
Universiade bronze medalists for Great Britain
Universiade medalists in rugby sevens
Wasps RFC players
Rugby union flankers
People educated at Dulwich College
People educated at Millfield